The Next Tycoon is a reality television series that was made in 2009 and originated in Atlanta, Georgia, by W. Cliff Oxford. As a televised business plan competition, the show features entrepreneurs who present their business plans in front of national business leaders to show what makes their business plan better than all the rest. Four finalists will then face a panel of media and business experts and a live audience. There is a group of judges and an alternate group called the School of Hard Knocks, which judges each contestant. The show is hosted by W. Cliff Oxford and Minoo Hosseini, while the judges and the School of Hard Knocks alternate per episode.

The series' first winner was entrepreneur Lisa S. Jones, who presented EyeMail Inc.

Judges 
 Salmeh Fodor
 Benn Konsynski
 Laura Colin
 Lydia Mondavi

School of Hard Knocks 
 Gary Kenworthy
 BB Webb
 Larry Colin

References 

2000s American reality television series
Year of television series debut missing
Year of television series ending missing
CBS original programming
2009 American television series debuts